ccMixter is a produsage community music site that promotes remix culture and makes samples, remixes, and a cappella tracks licensed under Creative Commons available for download and re-use in creative works. Visitors are able to listen to, sample, mash-up, or interact with music in a variety of ways including the download and use of tracks and samples in their own remixes. Most sampling or mash-up web sites on the Internet stipulate that users forgo their rights to the new song once it is created. By contrast, the material on ccMixter.org is generally licensed to be used in any arena, not just the ccMixter site or a specific contest. The ccMixter site contains over 10,000 samples from a wide range of recording artists, including high-profile artists such as Beastie Boys and David Byrne.

As a cultural phenomenon, ccMixter represents a direct response to what some say is the increasingly litigious attitude of organizations like the RIAA—one which prevents artists from appropriating elements of others' work for creative reuse in their own.

The site originated as a project of Creative Commons, with the idea being conceived of and developed by Neeru Paharia (then Assistant Director of Creative Commons) as a "Friendster for music" with the intent of exposing the genealogy of remixed music. The vision was both to create a body of openly licensed music, and to motivate artists to share by exposing how their work was being used by other artists in their remixes. Paharia hired Victor Stone (a developer and musician) to build the website, who then became the site's administrator, and project lead. In 2009 Creative Commons licensed the name 'ccMixter' and transferred operations to ArtisTech Media, a company run by members of the ccMixter community. The project maintains close organizational ties to independent minded, open music labels such as Magnatune and BBE. The site runs on ccHost, an award-winning open source multimedia content management system that is able to keep track of how content is being remixed.

In February 2009, Victor Stone, project lead of ccMixter, posted a "memoir" detailing the history and philosophy of the first four years of operations at the site.

Calls for remixes 
ccMixter began in 2004 as the host of the Wired CD remix contest. That was followed by several other remix contests where prizes included recording contracts.

In 2007 ccMixter eschewed remix contests, in part, due to concerns in the member community that the site was losing its focus on open music. Instead major artists such as DJ Vadim, Bucky Jonson (The Black Eyed Peas' live backing band) and Trifonic have contributed the solo studio tracks (stems) to entire albums making them available under Creative Commons licenses that allowed remixes. In addition there have been "calls for remixes" by members that post a cappellas, looking to create albums from remixes such Colin Mutchler, Brad Sucks, Tamara Barnett-Herrin (aka Calendar Girl) and Shannon Hurley.

Transfer of operations 
In May 2008, Creative Commons posted a Request for Proposals to take over the stewardship and operations of ccMixter. The RFP received broad coverage including Boing Boing, AdAge, and Wired.

On October 28, 2009, the fifth anniversary of the first upload to ccMixter, Creative Commons announced a transfer of operations to ArtisTech Media, a net label owned and operated by members of the ccMixter community.

Notable artists
Tamara Barnett-Herrin (Calendar Girl)
Brad Sucks
Bucky Jonson (The Black Eyed Peas' live backing band)
DJ Vadim
Fort Minor
Kristin Hersh
Shannon Hurley
Emily Richards (Snowflake)

References

External links
 

Hip hop websites
Creative Commons-licensed websites
Open content projects
Internet properties established in 2004
American music websites